The Maharlika Investment Fund (MIF), also known as the Maharlika Wealth Fund (MWF), is a proposed sovereign wealth fund for the Philippines.

Background
In late November 2022, seven lawmakers in the Philippine House of Representatives, including Martin Romualdez and Sandro Marcos, filed House Bill 6398 proposing the creation of a sovereign wealth fund for the Philippines to be known as the Maharlika Wealth Fund (MWF), inspired from South Korea's own sovereign wealth fund. The fund, if established, would be managed by the Maharlika Investments Corporation (MIC). President Bongbong Marcos has backed the establishment of a sovereign wealth fund in 2022, believing that it would be advantageous for the country.

Initially the Government Service Insurance System (GSIS) and the Social Security System (SSS) were obliged to contribute funds to the MIF under the proposed bill establishing the fund. The two institutions were later dropped as mandatory contributors. However, both the boards of the GSIS and SSS would be permitted to contribute if they approve such a move.

The MIF proposal has targeted an approval by the House of Representatives by December 12, 2022.

After President Marcos certified the bill as urgent, it was passed on its third reading in the lower house, with 279 lawmakers voting in favor of passing the bill. Only 6 lawmakers voted against: Gabriel Bordado of Camarines Sur 3rd District, Arlene Brosas of Gabriela party list, France Castro of ACT Teachers party list, Mujiv Hataman of Basilan, Edcel Lagman of Albay 1st District, and Raoul Manuel of Kabataan party list.

Reception
Economist Michael Batu said the fund, if managed properly, can help raise money to help the government's programs and achieve development goals. Global Source economist Romeo Bernardo, on the other hand, believes that the proposal is poorly timed and that a sovereign wealth fund would just add to the Philippines' current financial and fiscal risks and raised concern for potential mismanagement, mentioning the 1Malaysia Development Berhad scandal.

A group consisting of 12 organizations, namely the Foundation For Economic Freedom, Competitive Currency Forum, Filipina CEO Circle, Financial Executives Institute of the Philippines, Institute of Corporate Directors, Integrity Initiative, Inc., Makati Business Club, Management Association of the Philippines, Movement for Good Governance, Philippine Women's Economic Network, UP School of Economics Alumni Association and Women's Business Council Philippines, Inc., made a collective statement against the proposal. The group believes that there is no gap or "missing institution" in the Philippine economy that necessitates the creation of a sovereign wealth fund and prescribes the government to focus on the management of the country's fiscal deficit and public debt to avoid impediments to the delivery of public services and to prevent a downgrade of the Philippines' sovereign investment credit rating. It also notes that the Philippine economy has no commodity-based surpluses or surpluses from external trade from state-owned enterprises. It also opposed the idea of the GSIS and SSS contributing to the fund.

The Philippine Stock Exchange has made its support of the proposal, stating that the "primary mission is to facilitate the flow of capital into more productive and beneficial channels and as a result, contribute to efficient capital formation for the country".

See also
Coco Levy Fund scam
Pork barrel scam

References

Sovereign wealth funds
Proposals in the Philippines
Presidency of Bongbong Marcos
2022 controversies
2023 controversies
Bongbong Marcos administration controversies